Hoseynabad-e Zinabad (also romanized as Ḩoseynābād-e Zīnābād; also known as Ḩoseinābād-e Hūmeh, Hosein Abad Hoomeh, Ḩoseynābād, and Ḩoseynābād-e Sheybānī) is a village in Ganjabad Rural District, Esmaili District, Anbarabad County, Kerman Province, Iran. At the 2006 census, its population was 320, in 57 families.

References 

Populated places in Anbarabad County